Deaconess Midtown Hospital is a hospital in Evansville, Indiana.  It is part of the Deaconess Health System.

The hospital has 249 private one person rooms for inpatients. Admittedly it can serve 58 people at a time in its outpatient services.

It was known as Deaconess Hospital until August 2017, when it assumed its current name. Before it received a distinct name, it was informally distinguished from other Deaconess hospitals by the community as the Main Hospital, the Downtown Hospital, or the Hospital on Mary Street.

References

External links
Deaconess Hospital Website

Hospitals in Indiana
Healthcare in Evansville, Indiana
Healthcare in Southwestern Indiana
Buildings and structures in Evansville, Indiana